is a  mountain in the city of Sado, located on Sado Island in Niigata, Japan. The Sado mine and Mount Kinpoku are nearby.

Mountains of Niigata Prefecture